Coad's riffle minnow (Alburnoides coadi) is a species of small (10.8 cm max length) freshwater fish in the family Cyprinidae. It is endemic to the Namroud and Hableroud River drainage in Iran.

References 

Alburnoides
Fish described in 2015
Fish of Iran
Endemic fauna of Iran